Benoit Gosselin (born July 19, 1957) is a Canadian retired professional ice hockey left wing. He played seven games in the National Hockey League (NHL) with the New York Rangersduring the 1977–78 season. The rest of his career, which lasted from 1977 to 1984, was mainly spent in the minor leagues.

Junior career
Born in Montreal, Quebec, Gosselin played four years in the Quebec Major Junior Hockey League. He started his junior hockey career playing for the Shawinigan Cataractes in the 1973–74 and 1974–1975 seasons. He was later moved to the Sorel Éperviers for the 1975–76 season, and finally he played the Trois-Rivières Draveurs in the 1976–77 season.

In 1977 Gosselin was rated by The Hockey News draft preview issue as one of the QMJHL's top ten prospects.

NHL career
Gosselin had a short NHL career playing only seven games for the New York Rangers in the 1977–78 season, though did not record a point.

On September 25, 1979 he signed as an unrestricted free agent with the Winnipeg Jets, however he only played for their minor league affiliates.

Other leagues
Benoit Gosselin played for the New Haven Nighthawks, and the Sherbrooke Jets of the American Hockey League. He also played for the Tulsa Oilers of the Central Hockey League, and for three different International Hockey League teams: Toledo, Kalamazoo, and Dayton. In Europe, Gosselin played for Caen, a French hockey team.

Career statistics

Regular season and playoffs

References

External links
 

1957 births
Living people
Canadian ice hockey left wingers
Dayton Gems players
Drakkars de Caen players
Ice hockey people from Montreal
Kalamazoo Wings (1974–2000) players
New Haven Nighthawks players
New York Rangers draft picks
New York Rangers players
Quebec Nordiques (WHA) draft picks
Shawinigan Cataractes players
Sherbrooke Jets players
Sorel Éperviers players
Toledo Goaldiggers players
Trois-Rivières Draveurs players
Tulsa Oilers (1964–1984) players